Don't Play with Love is a 1949 West German comedy film directed by Hans Deppe and starring Lil Dagover, Albrecht Schoenhals and Bruni Löbel. It was shot at the Althoff Studios in Berlin. The film's sets were designed by the art director Willi Herrmann.

Cast
 Lil Dagover as Florentine Alvensleben
 Albrecht Schoenhals as Eduard Caroly
 Bruni Löbel as Friedel
 Paul Klinger as Walter Ulrich / Wupp
 Petra Peters as Wanja
 Georg Thomalla as Peter
 Ethel Reschke as Eva
 Horst Gentzen as Wolke
 Alexa von Porembsky as Frau Pleßmann
 Else Reval as Frau Meyer
 Else Ehser as Souffleuse
 Egon Ziesemer as Intendant
 Joe Furtner as Reiseleiter
 Friedrich Honna as Dicker Mann
 Otto Stoeckel as Spediteur
 Fred Falckenberg as Mitropa-Kellner
 Inge van der Straaten
 Ewald Wenck as Spediteur
 Herbert Weissbach

References

Bibliography
 Bock, Hans-Michael & Bergfelder, Tim. The Concise Cinegraph: Encyclopaedia of German Cinema. Berghahn Books, 2009.

External links 
 

1949 films
1949 comedy films
German comedy films
West German films
1940s German-language films
Films directed by Hans Deppe
German films based on plays
Films with screenplays by Karl Georg Külb
German black-and-white films
1940s German films
Films shot at Althoff Studios